Nykvarn is a locality and (since 1999) the seat of Nykvarn Municipality, Stockholm County, Sweden with 7,560 inhabitants in 2017. 1971-1998 it was a part of Södertälje Municipality. Nykvarn is the hometown of such bands as Hyena Breed, Feed Filiph, From Zero to Hero and Aldiureep, as well as Stanley Cup winner Carl Hagelin. The city hosts the annual rock and metal festival called Moshpit Open Festival.

Notable people 

 Margó Ingvardsson, Member of the Riksdag

References 

Populated places in Nykvarn Municipality
Municipal seats of Stockholm County
Swedish municipal seats